Nustar can refer to:

 Nuštar, a village in eastern Croatia
 NuStar Energy, a petrochemical distributor in the United States
 Nustar Resort & Casino, integrated resort and casino development in Cebu City, Philippines
 NuSTAR, a space-based X-ray telescope to survey for black holes